Serghina is a small town and rural commune in Boulemane Province of the Fès-Meknès region of Morocco. At the time of the 2004 census, the commune had a total population of 3726 people living in 733 households.

References

Populated places in Boulemane Province
Rural communes of Fès-Meknès